Hinds is a Spanish indie rock band from Madrid, formed in 2011, consisting of Carlotta Cosials (vocals, guitar), Ana García Perrote (vocals, guitar), Ade Martin (bass, backing vocals) and Amber Grimbergen (drums). The original name of the band was Deers, but they changed it at the end of 2014 after a threat of legal action from the similarly named band The Dears. The group chose "Hinds", a word that means "female deers", as the new name of the band and officially implemented the name change on 7 January 2015.

They have released three albums, one compilation LP and four singles. Their first studio album, Leave Me Alone, was released on 8 January 2016, and their second studio album, I Don't Run, was released on 6 April 2018. The band's third studio album, The Prettiest Curse was released on 5 June 2020.

History

Duo
Hinds started in 2011 as a duo called Deers, consisting of Carlotta Cosials and Ana García Perrote. After a break of a year and a half, the duo reformed in 2013. In March 2014, still as a duo, they recorded the tracks "Bamboo" and "Trippy Gum" and released both songs in Bandcamp as "Demo". The single was praised by music magazines including NME and by Paul Lester of The Guardian who chose Deers as "new band of the week" in September 2014, and by major musicians, such as Patrick Carney, The Pastels, and Bobby Gillespie.

Four piece
After releasing "Demo" the duo became a four piece, with close friend and former guitar player and singer Ade Martín on bass and the Netherlands-born Amber Grimbergen on drums.

In May 2014, Deers won the "Make Noise Malasaña" festival contest and were rewarded with recording their second single "Barn" in Converse Rubber Tracks Studio in Berlin. In June 2014 Deers played London for the first time and the following month "Demo" was released on vinyl by the record labels Lucky Number Music (UK) and Mom + Pop Music (USA). Later in 2014 they also played Germany and France, amongst other countries, and supported The Libertines, The Vaccines and Black Lips.

During this time they received positive reviews in Pitchfork, Pigeons and Planes, Gorilla vs. Bear, The Irish Times, Paste, and DIY. On 3 November 2014, they released the single "Barn" with the tracks "Castigadas en el granero" ("Punished in the Barn") and "Between Cans". Once again it was released by Lucky Number and was well received by the press.

World tour

In 2015, the band embarked on their first world tour, having already played Thailand and Australia in February and the United States in March, and played many major festivals, including Festival Internacional de Benicàssim, South by Southwest (where they played 16 concerts in just four days), Burgerama, Best Kept Secret and Dot to Dot Festival.

Leave Me Alone
The band also released a split single in April with The Parrots for Record Store Day, featuring the track “Davey Crockett (Gabba Hey!)", a cover from Thee Headcoats, produced by Árni Árnason from The Vaccines.

The band's debut album Leave Me Alone was released on 8 January 2016 on the label Lucky Number. The album featured 12 tracks, including a new single "Garden", previous singles "Bamboo", "Castigadas en el granero" ("Punished in the barn") and "Chili Town", and several new tracks. The album debuted at number 47 on the UK Albums Chart and charted on the Oricon weekly albums chart in Japan. A deluxe version of the album was released in September 2016 and featured previously released B-sides, 2 new cover songs and the first-take demos of tracks from the original album.

In August 2016, Very Best of Hinds so Far was released on the Mom & Pop Music label. The limited to 2,500 copies 10-inch LP featured six songs (the band's singles which were released prior to their debut album and one live song).

In February 2017, the band designed an exclusive clothing line through Urban Outfitters that also included an exclusive limited edition 7-inch of their song "Holograma", with 50% of the proceeds of sales going to Attendance Records, an Austin-based non-profit providing students at public schools a platform to create, write and produce their own albums and magazines.

I Don't Run
Production of the second Hinds album began in March 2017. In July 2017, Hinds performed the main title track to Disney movie Cars 3 for the Spanish version of the movie's soundtrack. On 11 August 2017, Hinds released a cover of Kevin Ayers' "Caribbean Moon" that was recorded while making their second album. The band's second album, I Don't Run, was released on 6 April 2018. The album was preceded by the singles and music videos for "New For You", "The Club" and "Finally Floating". In October 2018, the band released the new single "British Mind" along with a music video.

The Prettiest Curse 
The third Hinds studio album, The Prettiest Curse, was released on 5 June 2020 on Mom + Pop Music. It was originally scheduled for 3 April 2020, but was delayed because of the 2019-20 coronavirus pandemic. It includes more diverse instrumentation than previous albums, as well as singing in Spanish. In an interview with The Forty-Five the band explained their decision to change their management for this album: "We were under a lot of pressure from our team, part of our management. They started blaming us for venues not selling out. Everyone was frustrated and it made us really sad."  During the pandemic, Hinds recorded a video performance of two songs, "New For You" and "Come Back and Love Me". The video was recorded separately at each band members' home and edited together for release through Rolling Stone's website.

In the recording sessions for The Prettiest Curse, the band also recorded a cover of "Spanish Bombs" by The Clash. Explaining why they chose that song, the band said, "As Spaniards, we don’t usually get shout-outs in songs, like New York or London, so the Clash writing a song about our civil war made us feel honored." They released the song on 31 July 2020 and performed it on 21 August 2020 during a live stream 68th birthday tribute show to Joe Strummer called "A Song for Joe: Celebrating the Life of Joe Strummer".

On 21 August 2020, Hinds released a single jointly with Japanese band CHAI called "United Girls Rock'n'Roll Club", which has lyrics in Spanish, Japanese, and English. The song was released with a music video.

Musical style

Overall, Hinds are considered a garage rock, garage pop and lo-fi band, and have been compared to a blend of rock bands such as Velvet Underground, The Pastels, and C86-like bands, contemporary garage rock and 1960s groups with a pop sound, although they have mentioned Black Lips, Ty Segall, The Parrots, The Strokes, The Vaccines, and Mac DeMarco as their main influences.<ref name="NME">{{cite web|url=https://www.nme.com/blogs/nme-radar/hinds-aka-deers-interviewed-our-motto-is-our-shit-our-rules|title=Hinds (aka Deers) Interviewed: 'Our Motto Is 'Our Shit, Our Rulese|website=Nme.com|accessdate=2016-01-09}}</ref>

 Instruments 
In a 2020 interview with Mixdown, Hinds talked about the instruments they play. Bassist Ade Martin plays a 1966 Kalamazoo KB1 short-scale bass guitar with a Fender Bassman 100T amplifier and Fender Bassman 810 Neo Enclosure cabinet. Guitarist and singer Ana Perrote plays a Fender American Jazzmaster with a Fender Hot Rod Deluxe IV amplifier, and Casio keyboards. Drummer Amber Grimbergen plays a Gretsch drum kit with Zildjian cymbals, along with a Roland SPD-SX sampling pad. Guitarist and singer Carlotta Cosials plays a Gibson SG Standard Ebony with a Fender Hot Rod DeVille 212 IV amplifier.

Discography

Albums
 Leave Me Alone (2016) UK #47
 I Don't Run (2018) UK #77
 The Prettiest Curse (2020)

Compilation
 Very Best of Hinds so Far (2015) (10-inch LP limited to 2,500 copies)

Singles
"Demo" as Deers (2014)
"Barn" as Deers (2014)
"Split 7-inch w/ The Parrots (2015)
"Holograma" (2016)
"Holograma" (2017) (limited edition 7-inch pink vinyl exclusive for Urban Outfitters)El Sueño De Benilandia'' split 7-inch w/ Los Nastys (2017) (limited to 1,000 copies on translucent blood red vinyl)  
"Caribbean Moon" (2017)
"British Mind" (2018)
"Riding Solo" (2019)
"Good Bad Times" (2020)
"Come Back and Love Me <3" (2020)
Just Like Kids (Miau)" (2020)
"Burn" (2020)
"United Girls Rock'n'Roll Club" w/ Chai (2020)
"¿Y Cómo?" w/ Bratty (2022)

Music videos
"Bamboo" (2014)
"Trippy Gum" (2014)
"Castigadas en el Granero" (2014)
"Chili Town" (2015)
"Davey Crockett" (2015)
"Garden" (2015)
"San Diego" (2015)
"Easy" (2016)
"Warts" (2016)
"Bamboo" (animated video) (2016)
"New For You" (2018)
"The Club" (2018)
"Finally Floating" (2018)
"British Mind" (2018)
"Riding Solo" (2019) 
"Good Bad Times" (2020)
"Just Like Kids (Miau)" (2020)
"Burn" (2020)
"United Girls Rock'n'Roll Club" with Chai (2020)

References

External links
 Official website
 Interview with Hinds about their instruments
 Bandcamp
 Soundcloud
 Discogs

Garage rock groups
Spanish indie rock groups
Musical groups from Madrid
Musical groups established in 2011
English-language singers from Spain
All-female bands
2011 establishments in Spain
Mom + Pop Music artists